Henrik Dahl may refer to:

 Henrik Dahl (footballer)
 Henrik Dahl (politician)